Tartan is a pattern on clothing, usually associated with Scotland.

Tartan may also refer to:

 Tartan (Assyrian), the Assyrian term for a military commander-in-chief
 Tartan Army, fans of Scotland's national football team
 Tartan track, a synthetic track surface for athletics
 Tartan Films, a US and UK film distribution company
 The Tartans, a Jamaican reggae band
 Tartan or tartane, a type of ship
 Tartans, students and sports teams of Carnegie Mellon University
 The Tartan (Carnegie Mellon University), Carnegie Mellon University's student newspaper
 The Tartan (Radford University), Radford University's student newspaper
 Tartan Laboratories, an American software company later known as Tartan, Inc.
 Sillitoe tartan, the chequered pattern seen on many police vehicles
 Tartan Senior High School, a high school in Oakdale, Minnesota
 Tartan Marine, a boat building company
 Linsey-woolsey, a type of cloth made from linen and wool

See also
 Tartane